Denée Ayana Benton (born December 31, 1991) is an American actress and singer. She is best known for her performance as Natasha Rostova in the 2016 musical Natasha, Pierre, & The Great Comet of 1812 on Broadway, for which she was nominated for a Tony Award. Benton assumed the role of Eliza Hamilton in the Broadway production of Hamilton, beginning performances on October 30, 2018. Her television acting credits include UnREAL and The Gilded Age.

Early life and education
Benton was raised in Eustis, Florida. She named Rodgers and Hammerstein's Cinderella as an early inspiration for her desire to act.

She attended Trinity Preparatory School in Winter Park, Florida, before graduating from Carnegie Mellon University in 2014.

Career
Benton's first prominent professional role was her role as Nabulungi in the West End and U.S. national tour of The Book of Mormon. Later she was cast in the titular role of Natasha in Natasha, Pierre & The Great Comet of 1812 with the American Repertory Theatre; she made her Broadway debut when that show opened at the Imperial Theatre on November 14, 2016. Benton received a Tony Award for Best Actress in a Musical nomination for her role in the show. She appeared on The Late Show with Stephen Colbert on December 12, 2016, to discuss the role.

Benton gained wider prominence in her recurring role on the second season of the Lifetime series, UnREAL, as Ruby Carter in 2016.

On October 17, 2018, it was announced that Benton would assume the role of Eliza Hamilton in the Broadway production of Hamilton, beginning performances on October 30. She left the show on February 24, 2019.

As of 2022, Benton is a main cast member on the HBO historical drama series The Gilded Age, playing Peggy Scott. It was announced in February 2022 that HBO was going to renew this show for a second season. 

In May 2022, Benton played the role of Cinderella in Stephen Sondheim's Into the Woods at New York City Center opposite Heather Headley, Neil Patrick Harris, Sara Bareilles, and Gavin Creel. In November, she reprised her role replacing Krysta Rodriguez in the Broadway revival of the show. She left the production December 24. She would star opposite Creel, Brian d’Arcy James, Patina Miller, Stephanie J. Block, Montego Glover, Andy Karl, Joshua Henry, and Joaquina Kalukango.

Personal life 
Benton began dating Carl Lundstedt in 2014, whom she met in her acting program at Carnegie Mellon University. They married in 2020.

Theatre credits

Filmography

Film

Television

Awards and nominations

References

External links
 
 

Living people
Actresses from Florida
Place of birth missing (living people)
American musical theatre actresses
People from Winter Park, Florida
Carnegie Mellon University alumni
21st-century American actresses
African-American actresses
American television actresses
American film actresses
American stage actresses
1991 births
Theatre World Award winners
African-American women singers
Trinity Preparatory School alumni